Forest Hills is a city in Davidson County, Tennessee. The population was 5,038 at the 2010 census and 4,866 in a 2018 estimate.

History

Nashville was settled by Anglo-Europeans in 1780, and over the next two decades settlers staked claims on what was originally land cultivated and hunted by Native Americans. Several land grants were awarded to Revolutionary War veterans. The recipients of these grants seldom settled the land themselves, but either sold them to individuals or passed them along to their children or other relatives. In the Forest Hills area, William Nash received a  grant along what is now Granny White Pike south of Tyne Boulevard. Nash opted to sell off parcels of his land, including a  tract to Henry Compton in the early 19th century. Much of the land west of Hillsboro Road was part of a grant awarded to James Robertson.

A Revolutionary War veteran named McCrory chose to give his land grant to his son Thomas, who came to the area in 1790. McCrory built a two-story log dwelling on this property in 1798. The property was purchased by William B. Carpenter in 1837, and his daughter and son-in-law Mary E. and George Mayfield inherited the house in 1869. It remained in the Mayfield family until 1939. This is the oldest building remaining in Forest Hills, and it was listed on the National Register of Historic Places in 1982. As Nashville assumed prominence on the western frontier, a road known as the Natchez Trace was created to provide an overland route for settlers returning from New Orleans. Many settlers in the Ohio and Cumberland River valleys floated on rafts down the Mississippi River to New Orleans to sell their goods. Prior to the invention of the steamboat, western settlers had no choice but to walk home through the wilderness to reach home. In order to provide an improved road, the Natchez Trace was constructed from Nashville to Natchez, Mississippi.

Construction of the Natchez Trace began in 1802, and work continued on improving the road until it was officially declared complete in 1809. From the early 19th century to the 1820s, the Natchez Trace was the primary north/south route through central Tennessee. With the advent of steamboat travel, the use of the Natchez Trace declined significantly, and the old roadbed was used as local farm roads by the mid-19th century. Various surveys and land records of the 19th century refer to the "Natchez Trace" or "Natchez Road" located on at least three different routes in Davidson County, two of which ran through Forest Hills. As National Park Service historian Dawson Phelps wrote in the 1940s, "All this has been very confusing to many Nashvillians who dabble in local history. Each has a definite idea that one or the other of the roads mentioned above is the Old Trace and is eager, at the drop of a hat, to defend his position obstinately, profanely, and at great length."[1] However, a recent study of the Natchez Trace identified one of the main routes extending through what is now Forest Hills along either side of present-day Hillsboro Pike.

In northern Williamson County, the Natchez Trace crossed the Harpeth River in the vicinity of Union Bridge Road. A National Park Service study in 1935 stated that the Natchez Trace "crossed the Harpeth at Robinson Bend just upstream from Union Bridge, an old covered bridge." The Natchez Trace then turned north along present-day Stockit Road, and two branches diverged in what is now Edwin Warner Park. One of these branches continued north along what is now Page Road, and then followed the route of present-day State Route 100 (Harding Pike) to its terminus at Cockrill's Spring in Centennial Park.

The second of these branches ran east to present-day Hillsboro Pike, continuing north of Otter Creek before turning north through a gap, recrossing present-day Hillsboro Pike, and extending north through Green Hills to the terminus of the Natchez Trace at Cockrill's Spring. This route is shown on a map prepared by the National Park Service in 1935. With the decline of travel on the Natchez Trace, this roadbed became known as Compton Road, named for the prominent Compton family of the vicinity. Compton Road, shown on various maps of the 19th century, was separate from Hillsboro Pike through Green Hills. Residential and commercial expansion has obliterated almost all traces of this road north of Harding Place. A small intact section of the historic roadbed of Compton Road is located just north of Woodlawn Drive.

In addition to these two branches of the Natchez Trace, a third route led from Franklin to Nashville along what was historically known as the Middle Franklin Turnpike. This branch of the Natchez Trace left the main road at Leiper's Fork in Williamson County and extended east to Franklin. From Franklin, this route of the Natchez Trace followed the existing roadbed of the Middle Franklin Turnpike, now known as Granny White Pike. Although many travelers passed through the area on the Natchez Trace, settlement was initially not extensive. Compared to the rest of Davidson County, in the early 19th century few large farms existed within what is now Forest Hills. This was primarily because of the area's topography of steep forested hills, which proved difficult to till. In the northwest corner of the city limits are rich bottomlands along the tributaries of Richland Creek. In the central section of the city also are the fertile lands along Otter Creek. With these exceptions, few other areas of Forest Hills supported large-scale farming. Oats, Indian corn, and potatoes were primary crops, and because the topography limited crop production, livestock were essential to most farms. Swine were the dominant livestock on most farms, and many settlers also raised sheep, which made wool an important product. The number of cattle raised was minimal, with most farms emphasizing milk cows and the production of butter over beef cattle.

His sons Felix and Henry W. also acquired substantial property in the area. Corn and oats were his main crops along with ample livestock of mostly swine and sheep.[4] Felix Compton's home along Hillsboro Pike, which was on the land that has been developed into Burton Hills, stood until the 1980s when it was dismantled and moved to Dickson County.

Henry Compton Sr. (1784-1873) came to Tennessee in 1806. The dwelling was enlarged ca. 1900 to accommodate the Comptons' growing family, which included ten children. At this time his substantial farm was valued at $195,000 and produced 7,500 bushels of Indian corn, 1,800 bushels of oats, 1,500 bushels of potatoes, and 1,300 bushels of wheat. Compton's livestock included 200 swine, 150 sheep, and 29 horses. He also owned 41 cattle, 21 of which were milk cows.

The Compton estates grew over generations, and by the late 19th century their lands "stretched from the Belle Meade plantation on the west to the Lealand estate on the east."  An 1871 map of Davidson County confirms this statement and shows the estates of Felix Compton, Henry Compton Sr., and Henry Compton Jr. in the Richland Creek area. Henry Compton Sr.'s ca. 1819 two-story log house remains extant at 1645 Tyne Boulevard (DV11567). Also on the property is the Compton family cemetery, which contains approximately 25 graves.

William Scruggs established a large estate in the Forest Hills area during the 19th century. At his death, his nephew Edward Scruggs inherited the property. Edward Scruggs continued to operate a successful farm and was a key figure in the community as part shareholder in the Hillsboro Turnpike Company, which constructed Hillsboro Pike. In 1890, Scruggs built an elaborate two-story, frame, Queen Anne style dwelling with Eastlake detailing along Hillsboro Pike. With perforated gables and pediments, carved panels, a fishscale shingle roof, and numerous spindles and lattice work, the Scruggs house served as a landmark along the Pike. This house remains extant at 6251 Hillsboro Road (DV24931).

Geography

Forest Hills is bordered by Old Hickory Boulevard on the south, Granny White Pike on the east, Harding Place (also known as Battery Lane) on the north, and Chickering Road/The City of Belle Meade on the west.   The city hall is located within city limits, at the intersection of Hillsboro Pike and Old Hickory Blvd.

Like its neighbor, Belle Meade, it has distinct signage covenants concerning land size and use. Forest Hills is considered a "satellite city" of Nashville, and residents do not receive access to all city-county combined services, taking financial responsibility for some services like garbage collection on their own, while the city of Forest Hills provides other services, such as chipper service, road maintenance and stormwater management.

The area was developed as a suburb of Nashville in the wake of the post-World War II population and economic boom. Forest Hills was born as a result of the ensuing conflicts between suburban residents and Nashville city government as Nashville struggled to deal with the ramifications of suburban growth.

As its name implies, Forest Hills is composed primarily of steep wooded hills. These steep-sided hills were covered with forest until the early 20th century, when residential development extended south from Nashville. Several hills have water towers and cellular towers, and the WKRN and WNPT TV towers and the WSIX radio tower are located on a  hill north of Old Hickory Boulevard. In addition to the area's many hills, the south-central section of the community contains what was originally fertile farmland within the Otter Creek watershed. This area supported numerous small farms during the 19th and early 20th century.

Nashville has enjoyed prosperity and growth during the past several decades, which is reflected in the development of Forest Hills. Since 1970, hundreds of dwellings have been built in Forest Hills, and the community no longer retains many tracts of open space or farmland. Several of the community's hills and ridges — such as the properties along Laurel Ridge Drive and Fredericksburg Drive — also have been developed in recent decades.

Demographics

2020 census

As of the 2020 United States census, there were 5,038 people, 1,796 households, and 1,470 families residing in the city.

2000 census
As of the census of 2000, there were 4,710 people, 1,729 households, and 1,471 families residing in the city. The population density was 507.8 people per square mile (196.2/km2). There were 1,791 housing units at an average density of 193.1 per square mile (74.6/km2). The racial makeup of the city was 96.14% White, 1.40% African American, 0.06% Native American, 1.38% Asian, 0.40% from other races, and 0.62% from two or more races. Hispanic or Latino of any race were 0.76% of the population.

There were 1,729 households, out of which 36.3% had children under the age of 18 living with them, 79.4% were married couples living together, 3.9% had a female householder with no husband present, and 14.9% were non-families. 11.7% of all households were made up of individuals, and 6.0% had someone living alone who was 65 years of age or older. The average household size was 2.72 and the average family size was 2.96.

In the city, the population was spread out, with 25.8% under the age of 18, 3.5% from 18 to 24, 20.4% from 25 to 44, 34.3% from 45 to 64, and 15.9% who were 65 years of age or older. The median age was 45 years. For every 100 females, there were 97.5 males. For every 100 females age 18 and over, there were 95.8 males.

The median income for a household in the city was $124,845, and the median income for a family was $154,148. Males had a median income of $100,000 versus $41,125 for females. The per capita income for the city was $68,228, the second highest in the state after Belle Meade. About 1.2% of families and 1.7% of the population were below the poverty line, including 0.5% of those under age 18 and 3.6% of those aged 65 or over.

Historic properties

The growth and development of Forest Hills has resulted in the loss of most of the community's 18th- and 19th-century dwellings. Only a handful of properties dating from this early period remain extant. One of the most notable of these is the McCrory-Mayfield House at 1280 Old Hickory Boulevard, which was listed on the National Register of Historic Places in 1982. This two-story log dwelling was built circa 1798 and is the oldest remaining dwelling in Forest Hills.

Although 19th-century dwellings are rare, Forest Hills contains a number of significant houses built in the early 20th century. With improvements in automobiles and road systems, this section of Davidson County became a preferred area for country estates by the 1920s. Properties built along Hillsboro Pike mirrored those built in nearby Belle Meade as West Nashville became home to the area's most prosperous businessmen and professionals. Representative of this type of rural country home is Longleat at 5819 Hillsboro Pike, which was completed in 1932 as the home of insurance executive Thomas Tyne. Longleat was listed on the National Register in 1984 for its architectural significance. Another 20th-century home is "The Hibbettage" at 2160 Old Hickory Boulevard. Built in 1939, this two-story brick dwelling was constructed as a replica of The Hermitage; it was listed on the National Register in 1998 for its architectural significance.

Education
Metro Nashville Public Schools is the school district.

Percy Priest Elementary School is in Forest Hills.

References

External links
Official site
MTAS entry for City of Forest Hills

Cities in Tennessee
Cities in Davidson County, Tennessee
Cities in Nashville metropolitan area